Berbera Public Library, is the main library in the city centre of Berbera, Somaliland. The first Berbera library was opened in 2014. It was later expanded and is now known as the Berbera Public Library.

The idea of Berbera Public Library was born and announced on 29th Feb 2011, in a meeting gathered by Berbera Reader Club, local scholars, elders and businessmen in Berbera maritime and Fisheries Academy hall; however it was only an idea and dream back then.

In 2013, it was the time that the government cleared the perfect spot for the library and the Local Government successfully relocated the people who used to live that area.
In the same year, the former Somaliland president Ahmed Mohamed Mahmoud, put the first very stone as a sign to start the building of the library.

Action speaks loader then words, in 2014 the great Mayor of Berbera Mr. Abdishakuur Mahmoud Hassan (Ciddin), assigned a committee for the building and management of the library. The team contains five members from the community.
The first face of the library was started in late 2014 and during that time a big hall and fence was established successfully.
Within two years, from December 2015 to December 2017, the long waiting Berbera Public Library was finished and the ground opening of the library was held on 22nd April 2018.

References

External links
 Berbera Public Library on Twitter

Somaliland
World Digital Library partners
Libraries in Somaliland